The Greater Midland Community Centers, Inc. (GMCC) is a non-profit corporation in Midland, Michigan, founded in 2005 to provide guidance and assistance to five existing non-profit family and recreation centers in Midland County.

Reasons for creation
The GMCC is responsible for long-range and capital planning, executive staffing, human resources, financial office and accounting, computer technology, and  major fundraising for the five units under the GMCC corporate umbrella. By centralizing these business functions and services, each center's director is freed to concentrate on programming, membership, and customer service. Additionally, each center is able to share personnel with the other centers, and request staffing assistance from the other centers for special events.

Two unused classrooms at the Midland Community Center (MCC) received a makeover to become the offices for GMCC personnel in 2007.

Organizations
Midland Community Center - the oldest and largest of the centers; memberships as of March, 2009 was just under 4,000 which comprise 7,000 individuals.
North Midland Family Center - programs target the needs of local residents and include pre-school, daycare, social services, fitness (including Karate), computer literacy and Senior Adult activities
Coleman Community Network - in 2008, programs were expanded and the new fitness center use soared; the center moved to the old middle school building on Railway Street and changed their name to Railway Family Center. The child care and preschool programs were always popular, but the new aerobics classes, teen center, food pantry and after-school activities have high participation
Midland Curling Club - founded in 1962 by eleven members and their sheets were outside; the  Midland Curling Center opened October 31, 2008 and has four sheets for 120 members There are only two other Curling clubs in the state of Michigan.
Midland Community Tennis Center - opened in 1974 with 700 members sharing six courts; it now counts 3,000+ members with 16 indoor plus 16 outdoor courts It is the largest facility in the Midwest devoted exclusively to tennis.

First projects
Shortly after GMCC was created, they announced a $5.1 million fundraising campaign to "enhance the quality of life for Midlanders," according to GMCC CEO Chris Tointon. Individuals and businesses contributed to the project, but the majority came from local charitable trusts including the
Alden & Vada Dow Foundation, the Dow Chemical Company Foundation, the Dow Corning Corporation Foundation, The Herbert H. & Grace A. Dow Foundation, the Midland Area Community Foundation, the Charles J. Strosacker Foundation and the Rollin M. Gerstacker Foundation.

The money paid for three projects. The Midland Community Tennis Center received an overdue renovation of existing facilities and an expansion. The Midland Curling Club was relocated to a newly constructed building near the MCC. Lastly, the MCC created an "outdoor campus".

Funding
The United Way of Midland County provides significant funding for three of GMCC's  centers. For 2009, UW allocated $282,900 for education programs, $61,500 for self-sufficiency programs and $270,600 for health programs. The total of $615,000 was 16.4% of UWs budget. GMCC also relies on local companies to underwrite specific programs and free activities.

References

External links
 Greater Midland Community Centers website
 Midland Community Center website
 North Midland Family Center website
 Railway Family Center website
 Midland Community Tennis Center website
 Midland Curling Club website

Midland, Michigan
Community centers in Michigan
Non-profit organizations based in Michigan